Complete through 2007 Champ Car season.

See also 

 List of Champ Car circuits
 List of fatal Champ Car accidents
 List of Champ Car drivers
 List of Champ Car teams
 List of Champ Car winners
 List of IndyCar pole positions

Champ Car